King were a British new wave band which formed in 1984. The band achieved chart success in 1985, and are best known for their hit single "Love & Pride", which reached number 2 in the UK. The band had two Top 20 albums (both certified Gold) and five Top 30 singles in the space of a year.

Overview
The band was formed from the remnants of Coventry rock-ska band the Reluctant Stereotypes, along with producer Paul Sampson. After the Reluctant Stereotypes, singer Paul King formed the Raw Screens, who perfected their act and style to what Paul King and his manager Perry Haines called "Multi Tone", a reference to "Two Tone", and then, in 1983, relaunched the group as band King from the surname of lead singer Paul King.

As lead singer, Paul King wore a mullet haircut and spray-painted Doc Marten's Boots – a look described "like the Child Catcher from Chitty Chitty Bang Bang". The band released two UK Top 20 albums on CBS, both produced and mixed by Richard James Burgess, who also played drums on most of the debut album Steps in Time (the second LP, Bitter Sweet, saw Adrian Lillywhite on drums). Both albums were certified gold and produced five hit singles, the most successful being the UK No. 2 hit, "Love & Pride". "Love & Pride" was King's only single to chart on the US Billboard Hot 100 which peaked at No. 55 in September 1985.

Despite a year of success, the band split up in 1986. In 1987, Paul King released a solo album entitled Joy, produced by American producer Dan Hartman. After that, he briefly worked as a VJ for MTV.

In 1998, a compilation album was released, entitled The Best of King – Love & Pride, with 18 tracks, featuring the band's greatest hits and stand-out tracks, including Paul King's one minor solo hit, "I Know".

Cherry Red Records released a remastered version of Bitter Sweet in 2007 followed in 2010 by a remaster of Steps In Time  and in 2018 by another King compilation entitled Remixes & Rarities, which contained rare tracks not found on the reissues.

Line-up
Paul King – vocals, piano
Mick Roberts – keyboards, synthesizers, piano, backing vocals
Anthony "Tony" Wall – bass guitar
Jim "Jackal" Lantsbery – guitar, backing vocals
John Hewitt – drums
Adrian Lillywhite – drums
Colin Heanes – drums

Discography

Albums

Studio albums

Compilation albums

Video albums

Singles

Solo
Paul King
Joy (1987)

References

External links
King official website
Mike Roberts official website

English new wave musical groups
Musical groups from Coventry
Musical groups established in 1984
Musical groups disestablished in 1986
Musical quartets